Simon R. Cherry is a biomedical engineer, and is currently a Distinguished Professor at University of California, Davis, and a published author.

In 2016, Cherry was elected as a member to the National Academy of Engineering for "development of nuclear emission imaging and magnetic resonance technologies for medical science".

References

External links
 

Living people
American biomedical engineers
University of California, Davis faculty
21st-century American scientists
Fellows of the Biomedical Engineering Society
Year of birth missing (living people)